The Cameroon Civil Aviation Authority, abbreviated "CCAA", is a public administrative establishment of a technical nature that ensures the implementation of civil aviation regulation policy, the monitoring of air transport and airport development, as well as the control and regulation of civil aviation safety andsecurity.

Since its creation in 1999, the CCAA has been the secular arm of the government in coordinating and monitoring civil aviation activities in Cameroon. It is the Civil Aviation Administration of Cameroon.

Its head office is in Yaoundé. at the Air Base 101.

History 
The use of aviation as a means of transporting people and goods flourished considerably in the aftermath of the Second World War, fostered by the implementation of the Convention on International Civil Aviation (Chicago Convention). This Convention was signed on 7 December 1944 by 52 States which agreed on certain principles and arrangements, so that international civil aviation could develop in a safe and orderly manner. In addition, the Chicago Convention created the International Civil Aviation Organization, a specialized agency of the United Nations that is responsible for the coordination and regulation of international air transport.

Between 1945 and 1960, Cameroon embarked on the path of self-determination saw the creation of many airfields, thus allowing the establishment of internal and international air links. Having obtained its independence on January 1, 1960, Cameroon ratified the Chicago Convention on January 15, 1960. Thus, Cameroon has undertaken to assist in achieving the highest achievable degree of uniformity in regulations, standards, procedures and organization relating to personnel, airways and ancillary services, in all matters for which such uniformity facilitates and improves air navigation.

In order for Cameroon to fulfil obligations under the Chicago Convention, a Civil Aviation Authority (DAC) housed in the Ministry of Transport was created in 1963.

From 1963 to 1998, under the authority of a Director, the DAC was responsible for the development and implementation of government policy on air transport. This structure was also responsible for the design and implementation of air traffic and air transport regulations, the supervision of air navigation, the inspection and control of the operation of airport facilities, the coordination of all activities related to air transport and participation in international conferences within its field of activity.

In the ’80s and ’90s, ICAO found that some States were experiencing difficulties in meeting their obligations to oversee the implementation of the standards and recommended practices contained in the Annexes to the Chicago Convention. In this regard, ICAO has mandated States to establish autonomous civil aviation authorities.

It is in response to ICAO guidelines that the CCAA was created in favour of Article No. 98/023 of 24 December 1998 on the civil aviation regime in Cameroon, reinforced by its implementing decree No. 99/198 of 16 September 1999.

Over time, the missions of the CCAA and the powers of its Director General have been extended through:
 Law No. 2013/010 of 24 July 2013 on the civil aviation regime in Cameroon and its implementing decree No. 2015/232 of 25 May 2015;
 Decree No. 2018/006 of 8 January 2018 approving and making enforceable the National Civil Aviation Security Program of Cameroon;
 Decree No. 2019/174 of 9 April 2019 on the reorganization and functioning of the Aeronautical Authority.

Missions 
The main missions of the CCAA are:

 the implementation of national and Community civil aviation policy;
 participation in the drafting of civil aviation laws and regulations;
 the development and updating of national civil aviation safety and security programmes;
 the supervision of civil aviation safety and security in Cameroon;
 economic supervision of all aeronautical activities;
 the organisation and management of national airspace, in collaboration with the competent military authorities;
 the management of aeronautical assets;
 airport development planning, in collaboration with other relevant authorities and agencies;
 the safe operation and development of unassessed aeronautical services and facilities;
 the implementation of security measures at airports;
 coordination of the provision of search and rescue services;
 the negotiation of agreements in the field of civil aviation;
 the management of the portfolio of agreements signed by Cameroon in the field of civil aviation;
 monitoring of relations with regional and international organizations.

Organization 
The organizational chart of March 11, 2016, modified and completed in 2017, organizes the CCAA into central services and decentralized services. Central services include services attached to the Directorate General and a central administration.

At the operational level, the activities of the CCAA are articulated around three (03) implementation processes: security supervision, safety supervision as well as the development of air transport and airport operations.

Central services 
The main operational structures of the central services  are:

 The Directorate of Aviation Safety is responsible for the supervision of safety. It shall ensure the implementation of national civil aviation safety requirements and coordinate the development and implementation of national civil aviation safety programme.
The Directorate of Security and Facilitation is responsible for overseeing the security and facilitation of civil aviation. It shall ensure the implementation of the relevant national requirements and ensure the constant assessment of the threat in liaison with the administrations concerned.
The Directorate for the Operation of Airport Commands is responsible for providing air navigation services and operating aerodromes not licensed by the State.
The Operational Security Division is responsible for the implementation of security measures at airports in collaboration with partner administrations
The Air Transport Division is responsible for the economic supervision of aeronautical activities, the monitoring of the liberalization of the aviation sector and the implementation of environmental protection measures.
The Training School which provides training in civil aviation.

Decentralized services 
Decentralized services include:

 the commands of the international airports located in Douala, Yaoundé-Nsimalen and Garoua;
 the commands of category B airports located in Maroua, Bafoussam, Bamenda and Ngaoundéré;
 the commands of category C airports located in Koutaba, Tiko, Bertoua, Batouri, Kribi and Mamfé.
 the training centres that currently exist in Douala and Yaoundé. The training centre in Douala certified by ICAO as a Regional Training Centre in Civil Aviation Security.

Financing 
The resources of the aeronautical authority come from:  

 fees for services rendered;
 aeronautical fees;
 state subsidies;
 proceeds from aeronautical heritage concessions;
 donations and legacies;
 any other resources that may be assigned to it.

Fees for services rendered are levied in the context of its tasks relating to the supervision of the safety and security of civil aviation, as well as the economic supervision of aeronautical activities.

Aeronautical fees by airlines in return for services rendered in connection with the operation of unconsed air services, the implementation of airport security measures and airport development.

CCAA has an annual budget approved by its board of directors.

Some figures (by 2021, August 21) 

 901 staff broken down as follows:  
 72.3% of technical staff and 27.7% of administrative staff;
 67.6% male and 32.4% female;
 34.4 years  of average age of staff;
 27 security inspectors and 14 security inspectors;
 06 aerodromes operated: Bafoussam, Koutaba, Tiko, Bertoua, Batouri, Kribi and Mamfé;
 02 control towers operated:  Maroua and Ngaoundéré;
 06 AFIS aerodromes operated:  Bafoussam, Koutaba, Tiko, Bertoua, Batouri, Kribi and Mamfé;

Successive leaders

See also
 Kenya Airways Flight 507

References

External links
Cameroon Civil Aviation Authority
Cameroon Civil Aviation Authority 

Government of Cameroon
Cameroon
Aviation organizations based in Cameroon
Civil aviation in Cameroon